The Bioinorganic Chemistry Award has been awarded by the Dalton division of the Royal Society of Chemistry every two years since 2009. The winner receives £2000 and undertakes a lecture tour in the UK.

Winners
Source:

See also

 List of chemistry awards

References

Awards of the Royal Society of Chemistry
Bioinorganic chemistry